The Boys is the third Korean studio album and the fourth overall by South Korean girl group Girls' Generation. The record saw the contribution of the group's previous collaborator Hitchhiker, who produced the tracks "Telepathy" and "Sunflower". The title track, "The Boys", was a result of experimenting with new producers, including American Grammy Award-winning producer Teddy Riley. Musically, The Boys mostly contains uptempo dance tracks and occasionally empowerment ballads.

The album was released on October 19, 2011, by SM Entertainment, and was distributed in South Korea by KMP Holdings. An alternate version titled Mr. Taxi featured a Korean-language version of the group's 2011 Japanese-language single "Mr. Taxi", and an English-language version of "The Boys" was released on December 9, 2011. An international version featuring the English-language version of "The Boys" was released in January 2012 by Interscope and Polydor Records, which are affiliated with Universal Music Group, in order to expand the group's endeavor to the global music scene. To promote the record for international audiences, the group appeared on television shows in the United States and France.

Upon its release, The Boys received generally positive reviews from music critics. Commercially, the album was a success in the group's native country South Korea, peaking atop the Gaon Album Chart and was the best-selling album of 2011 in the country. The project won the Digital Daesang Awards at both the 26th Golden Disk Awards and 21st Seoul Music Awards. It also achieved success in other Asian countries, including Japan (reaching number 2 on the Oricon Albums Chart) and Taiwan (reaching number 3 on the G-Music chart). The record additionally charted at numbers 64 and 130 in Spain and France, respectively. In the United States, The Boys reached number 2 on the World Albums and number 17 on the Top Heatseekers.

Background
In August 2011, S.M. Entertainment confirmed that the group will be back in September with their third full-length album, but the release date was eventually delayed to October due to Sooyoung’s unexpected car accident injury.

Release and promotion

On September 26, 2011, the first teaser photo featuring Taeyeon was released online for the impending comeback for "The Boys", followed by Sunny and Hyoyeon on September 27, Jessica, Sooyoung, and Tiffany on September 28, and Yoona, Yuri, and Seohyun on September 29. The girls all represented a fairytale theme, with Taeyeon as Snow White, Sunny as Little Red Riding Hood, Hyoyeon as Thumbelina, Jessica as Elisa, Sooyoung as Rapunzel, Tiffany as Ariel, Yoona as Milady de Winter, Yuri as Karen, and Seohyun as The Snow Queen. On September 30, 2011, SM Entertainment announced that the album would be indefinitely postponed due to ongoing discussions about an album release in the United States, with details to be released as soon as they were confirmed.

On October 1, 2011, SM Entertainment released the first teaser for "The Boys", followed by the second teaser on October 7, 2011. Both teasers showed Yoona picking up a black crystal, and proceeds to show the rest of the members in an outside, misty atmosphere. Later on October 13, 2011, SM Entertainment released 16-second teaser clips for both the Korean and English versions of "The Boys". The teaser depicts the girls rapping and chanting along to the song. On the same day, SM released 30-second teaser clips of "The Boys", which showed a longer version of the previous teaser videos.

The album was officially released on October 19, 2011, and the group's comeback performances commenced on October 21, 2011, starting with Music Bank. It was confirmed on November 27 that an alternate version of the album will be out on December 8. The Korean version of "Mr. Taxi" was promoted as the second single from the album and the main promotional single off the alternate version of the album.

The album was promoted with the tour "Girls' Generation World Tour Girls & Peace, starting on June 8, 2013, in Olympic Gymnastics Arena, Seoul, South Korea, and ending in Cotai Arena, Macau, on February 15, 2014. The tour also promoted their 4th studio album, I Got A Boy.

International releases and promotions

Japan
A Japanese version of "The Boys" was produced for the repackaged album of Girls' Generation, released on December 28, 2011. It included the song "Time Machine", for which an MV was revealed on March 13, 2012. However, it was never officially promoted on Japanese TV broadcasts. On December 19, 2011, Girls' Generation performed the Japanese version of "The Boys" live on the Japanese TV reality show, Hey! Hey! Hey! Music Champ.

North America
"The Boys"  was announced for an American release on November 19, 2011, under their American label Interscope Records, but after postponement, the single was released digitally on December 20 instead. SM Entertainment confirmed that the girls would promote their debut US single, "The Boys" on the late-night talk show the Late Show with David Letterman and on syndicated daytime talk show Live! with Kelly on January 31 and February 1 respectively.

The Boys was released in the US on January 17, 2012. This marks Girls' Generation's first physical release in the country, using the Korean single cover of the title track as the American album cover. Except for the English version of the title track, the entire album consists of Korean-language songs, all of which were taken from the original edition of The Boys. Also, four remixes of "The Boys" are included in the US edition, the first of which features American rapper Snoop Dogg.

Europe
They performed "The Boys" on the French show, Le Grand Journal after it was announced that they were to release "The Boys" on February 13, 2012, through Universal Music Group’s Polydor Records in France.

Singles
"The Boys" was released worldwide via iTunes on October 19, 2011. In an interview with MTV K, members Jessica and Tiffany mentioned that the recording of both English and Korean versions took a week to finish. The song marked the first time a Girls' Generation member had written a single for the group, with Tiffany writing the English rap and final chorus of the song. In the US, the single failed to enter the US Billboard Hot 100 but entered the Top 100 on the iTunes 200 Top Songs, and later reached the Top 30 for a moment on its first day of release. It dropped off the chart three days later; despite this, the song managed to sell over 21,000 copies. However, the Korean Version debuted at number 1 on the Billboard's Korea K-Pop Hot 100. The Korean version of "Mr. Taxi" was the album's second single to promote an alternate version of the album.

Accolades

Commercial performance
The Boys was commercially successful in Asian regions. It debuted at number 1 on South Korea's Gaon Weekly Albums chart and sold over 460,000 copies in South Korea alone, which made it the best selling girl group album of the 2010s decade in the country. The album also peaked at number 2 on the Oricon Weekly Albums Chart, the standard album chart of Japan, with sales records of more than 100,000 copies in the country. In addition, the album sold 26,000 copies in Taiwan. The album charted both in Spain and France at position number 64 and number 130 respectively for one week. A total of ten songs charted within the top ten on the Gaon Chart, including "Telepathy", "Top Secret", "Vitamin", "How Great Is Your Love", and "Mr. Taxi".

The US edition of The Boys has not replicated the same commercial performance as it did in its native country; the album failed to enter the Billboard 200, but debuted at number 2 on the Billboard World Albums and re-entered the Heatseekers Album Chart at number 17.

Track listing
Credits adapted from Naver

Personnel
Credits for The Boys are adapted from AllMusic.

 David Anthony – Remixing
 Boo Min Kim – Composer
 Byung Seok Kim – Bass
 Byung-Ok Seo – Make-Up
 Chan Yong Eom – Engineer, String Engineer
 Hanna Cho – Repertoire
 Jane Choi – Marketing, Promoter
 Disco Fries – Remixing
 Eui Seok Jung – Engineer
 Eun-a Kim – Publicity, Public Relations
 Eun-Jeong Kwak – Engineer
 Eun-Kyeng Jung – Engineer
 Lola Fair – Vocals (Background)
 Gang-Mi Kim – Make-Up
 Richard Garcia – Arranger, Composer
 Gi-Hyun Kim – Publicity, Public Relations
 Girls' Generation – Primary Artist, Vocals (Background)
 Hae Young Jung – Composer
 Hae-Young Lee – Copyright Coordinator, Publishing
 Nikki Semin Han – Supervisor
 Martin Hansen – Arranger, Composer
 Hee-Jun Yoon – Artist Development
 Ho-Jin Kim – Management, Promoter
 Hoon Jeon – Mastering
 Greg Hwang – Choreographer, Direction
 Hye-Young Eom – Management
 Hyoyeon – Group Member
 Hyun Hwang – Arranger, Composer, Director
 Hyun-Jung Ryu – Make-Up
 Neil Jacobson – A&R
 Jae Myoung Lee – Vocal Director
 Gabriella Jelena Jangfeldt – Arranger, Composer
 Kyle Chang-Hwan Jeong – Director
 Jeung-Ah Lee – Artist Development
 Ji-Hong Kim – Management, Promoter
 Ji-Young Choi – Hair Stylist
 Ji-Young Lee – Make-Up
 Ji-Yu Hong – Composer
 John Hyun-Kyu Lee – English Supervision
 Jong-Pil Gu – Engineer, Mixing
 Jung Bae Kim – Composer
 Jung-Ah Kang – Management, Promoter
 Jam3s K3nn3dy – Additional Production
 Ji Hyun Kim – Vocals (Background)
 John Kim – Management (US), Marketing
 Tae Woo Kim – Photography
 Yongdeok Kim – Management, Promoter
 Young-Hu Kim – Arranger, Composer, Director, Engineer
 Young-Min Kim – Executive Supervision
 Kwang Wook Lim – Arranger
 Chris Sung-Su Lee – A&R, Coordination, Direction
 Jinny Lee – Marketing, Promoter
 Ji-Sun Lee – Publicity, Public Relations
 Nile Lee – Conductor, String Arrangements
 Seongho Lee – Engineer, Mixing
 Soo-Man Lee – Producer
 Sung Ho Lee – Marketing, Promoter
 Lin Kang – Marketing, Promoter

 Sarah Lundback – Arranger, Composer
 Scott Pearson Mann – Arranger, Composer
 Tony Maserati – Mixing
 Sam McCarthy – Arranger, Composer
 Hee Jin Min – Art Direction, Design, Visual Direction
 Mina Jungmin Choi – Marketing, Promoter
 Min-Kyong Kim – Copyright Coordinator, Publishing
 Mirae Seo – Vocals (Background)
 Jean T. Na – Composer
 Rino Nakasone – Choreographer
 So Young Nam – Managing Director
 Jin Namkoong –  Engineer, Mixing
 Hun-Young Park – Visual Direction
 Hye Jin Park – Repertoire
 Jun-Young Park – Video Director
 Paolo Prudencio – Arranger, Composer
 Teddy Riley – Arranger, Composer, Director, Engineer, Mixing, Remixing, Vocals (Background)
 Adros Rodriguez – Mixing
 Chad Royce-  Arranger, Composer
 Sang-Hee Jung – Publicity, Public Relations
 Lucas Secon – Composer
 Seohyun – Group Member
 Seong Je Hwang – Arranger, Composer, Director, Engineer
 Jae Shim –  Choreographer, Direction
 Agnes Shin – Vocals (Background)
 Mikkel Remee Sigvardt – Composer
 Snoop Dogg – Featured Artist
 Soo Wan Jung – Guitar
 Soo-Koung Suh – Stylist
 Soonsoo-a-Reum Kim – Hair Stylist
 Soonsoo-Kyoung-Mee Shin – Jacket Design, Make-Up
 Clinton Sparks – Remixing
 Sung Gun Oh – Engineer, String Engineer
 Sung-Woo Choi –  Management, Promoter
 Tae Yoon Kim – Composer
 Taeyeon – Group Member
 Tesung Kim – Arranger, Composer, Director, Engineer
 Thomas Troelsen – Composer
 Sharon Vaughn – Arranger, Composer
 Allison Veltz – Arranger, Composer
 Mathias Peter Venge – Arranger, Composer
 Peter Lars Wennerberg – Arranger, Composer
 Yong Shin Kim – Arranger, Conductor, Piano, String Arrangements
 Janie Yoo – A&R, Coordination, Direction
 Yoo Young-jin – Composer, Director, Engineer, Mixing, Vocals (Background)
 Yoo-Da Soonsoo-Heewon – Hair Stylist
 Young Hyun Kim – Conductor, Guitar, String Arrangements, Supervisor, Vocal Editing
 Young Shin Kim – Director
 Young Son – Video Director
 Soo Young – Composer
 Young-En Kweon – Hair Stylist
 Young-Jun Tak – Choreographer, Director
 Yung Strings – Strings
 Yun-Kyoung Cho – Composer

Charts

Weekly charts

Year-end charts

Release history

See also
 List of Gaon Album Chart number ones of 2011
 List of best-selling albums in South Korea

References

2011 albums
Girls' Generation albums
SM Entertainment albums
KMP Holdings albums
Albums produced by Teddy Riley
Interscope Records albums
Polydor Records albums
Korean-language albums